The Ten Days of Brescia was a revolt which broke out in the northern Italian city of that name, which lasted from 23 March to 1 April 1849.

In the early 19th century Brescia was subject of the Austrian empire, as the rest of Kingdom of Lombardy–Venetia. The revolt, headed by the patriot Tito Speri, began on the same day as the Battle of Novara (though news of Austria's victory there had not yet reached Brescia).

The Austrian troops, under General Nugent, were initially surprised and retired to the castle, from which they heavily cannonaded the city, damaging many of Brescia's historical monuments. A total encirclement of Brescia was established by the Austrians beginning on the 8th day of the revolt, when reinforcements arrived. The following day General Haynau, later nicknamed "The Hyena of Brescia", came and demanded the unconditioned surrender of the Bresciani. As the latter refused, the fighting continued until late night, when the heads of the revolt decided to surrender. The following day (April 1), however, the Austrian troops sacked the city and massacred numerous inhabitants before the surrender could be signed.

Some 1,000 citizens were killed during the battle. For its fierce resistance, the city of Brescia earned the surname Leonessa d'Italia (Lioness of Italy).

See also
Risorgimento
Battle of Novara (1849)

Sources

Revolts of the Italian unification
Battles involving Austria
Conflicts in 1849
1849 in Italy
Brescia
History of Lombardy
1849 in the Austrian Empire
March 1849 events
April 1849 events
Rebellions against the Austrian Empire
Battles of the First Italian War of Independence